Nichola Simpson (born 10 October 1956) is an athlete from Oxford, Great Britain. She competes in compound archery, and has reached a career high of 4th in the FITA world rankings (23 August 2008).

Simpson is a member of Oxford Archers, and is coached by her husband Ian Simpson.

Notable achievements
Having taken up archery in 1987, Nichola has been a member of the GB women's compound team since 1993, with whom she won Gold at the 2010 Commonwealth Games. She won a bronze medal at the 1995 World Indoor Archery Championships held in Birmingham and a further Bronze at the 2nd World Cup leg in San Salvador in 2006, which was Great Britain's first Archery World Cup medal. She had her most successful season to date in 2007, winning silver at 2 world cup events, in Porec and Boé and also the silver medal at the year end Grand Final in Lausanne.

Records
Nichola currently holds the following British records (correct 27 March 2013):

Awards
Nichola was awarded the Oxfordshire Sportswoman of the year award in 2007.

References

External links
 Oxford Archers
 Archery World Cup 2008 Finals on YouTube

British female archers
1956 births
Living people
Sportspeople from Oxford
Commonwealth Games gold medallists for England
Commonwealth Games medallists in archery
Archers at the 2010 Commonwealth Games
Medallists at the 2010 Commonwealth Games